Darian MacKinnon (born 9 October 1985) is a Scottishfootball coach and former player who is a first-team coach at Hamilton Academical.

MacKinnon played as a midfielder and striker and spent his early career in Junior football with Dumbarton United, Dumbarton Harp, St. Thomas', St. Patrick's Athletic and Clydebank, before turning professional with Hamilton Academical in 2012. He alsoplayed League football for Ayr United and Partick Thistle, before returning to the Junior ranks with Drumchapel United in 2020.

Early and personal life
At 16 he was charged with assault, and at 18 he was sentenced to four-and-a-half years in prison. He spent two years and seven months in a young offenders institution. He became a father for the first time shortly after being released.

Career
MacKinnon began his career with Dumbarton United, Dumbarton Harp, St. Thomas' and St. Patrick's Athletic, before joining Clydebank in May 2010. Playing as a forward at Clydebank, he scored 31 goals in 69 appearances in all competitions. He combined his Junior career with working on a building site.

He turned professional with Hamilton Academical in July 2012, making the unusual move up from the Junior level directly to the second tier of Scotland's professional setup at the age of 26. After two appearances in cup competitions, he made his debut in the Scottish Football League on 11 August 2012, appearing as an 80th-minute substitute. He joined Ayr United on an emergency loan deal in September 2012. Following his return to Hamilton, MacKinnon scored his team's equalising goal in a 1–1 draw with Falkirk after appearing as a substitute, after which he stated that he wanted to start the next game. MacKinnon later spoke about his hopes for a good run in the Scottish Cup, and stated that the quarter-final against Falkirk on 2 March 2013 was the "biggest game" of his career. A few days later, on 8 March 2013, MacKinnon signed a two-year extension to his contract. In April 2013, MacKinnon publicly stated his support for new caretaker manager Alex Neil. MacKinnon came fourth in the Hamilton 'Player of the Year Awards' for 2012–13, his first season in professional football; he stated he would continue to fight for a place in the team.

Once his second season began, MacKinnon spoke about how pleased he was with how the team were doing. At the end of the season, he was part of the Accies team which won promotion to the Scottish Premiership, via a play-off win over Hibernian.

In September 2014, MacKinnon was given a four-match ban after being sent off in a prior game. In January 2016 he signed a new contract with the club until the summer of 2017, and in December 2016 he signed a new contract until May 2019.

Having begun to combine his Accies playing role with youth coaching duties at the club, in June 2018 the Under-17 team coached by MacKinnon (along with Dougie Imrie) became Scottish champions in the age group, qualifying for the UEFA Youth League. In July 2018 he became Hamilton's captain. As of March 2019 he was coaching the club's under-16s.

MacKinnon was released by Hamilton in January 2020, and he was then signed by Partick Thistle.

On 5 July 2020, MacKinnon joined Drumchapel United.

In August 2022 he returned to Hamilton Academical as a first-team coach.

Career statistics

References

1985 births
Living people
Scottish footballers
Dumbarton Harp F.C. players
Clydebank F.C. players
Hamilton Academical F.C. players
Ayr United F.C. players
Scottish Football League players
Association football midfielders
Association football forwards
Scottish Professional Football League players
Scottish Junior Football Association players
Hamilton Academical F.C. non-playing staff
Scottish people convicted of assault
Scottish prisoners and detainees
Sportspeople from Dumbarton
Footballers from West Dunbartonshire
People educated at Our Lady & St Patrick's High School
Partick Thistle F.C. players
Drumchapel United F.C. players